Sead Osmić (born 2 January 1970) is a Bosnian retired football player.

Club career
He formed a great partnership with striker Amir Osmanović at Radnički Lukavac, scoring 18 goals in the 1995/96 season in addition to Amir Osmanović' 27 goals to help Radnički finish in a historic 2nd place in the league.

International career
Osmić made his debut for Bosnia and Herzegovina in a December 1996 friendly match away against Brazil and has earned a total of 3 caps, scoring no goals. His final international was a February 1997 Dunhill Cup match against Indonesia.

References

External links

Profile - NFSBIH

1970 births
Living people
Association football midfielders
Bosnia and Herzegovina footballers
Bosnia and Herzegovina international footballers
FK Radnički Lukavac players
Premier League of Bosnia and Herzegovina players